Turkey in Asia or Asiatic Turkey usually refers to the extensive West Asian territories of the former Ottoman Empire.

It may also refer to:

 Anatolia, or Asia Minor, the Asiatic peninsula of modern Turkey
 Former Ottoman holdings in the region extending towards South West Asia, e.g. Arabia

See also
 Administrative divisions of the Ottoman Empire
 Administrative divisions of Turkey
 East Thrace
 Rumelia (Turkey in Europe)